Ian Martin Seib (born 15 September 1946) is a former cricketer who played first-class cricket for Queensland from 1969 to 1975.

Ian Seib was a solid opening batsman whose only century in 63 first-class innings was 101, the highest score in the match, when Queensland defeated Western Australia in the Sheffield Shield in 1973-74. He won the man of the match award in his first List A match when he scored 64 not out off 146 balls to steer Queensland to victory over New South Wales in 1970-71.

His son Rod is a rugby union coach and a former rugby player for Queensland.

References

External links
 
 Ian Seib at CricketArchive

1946 births
Living people
Australian cricketers
Queensland cricketers
Cricketers from Brisbane